is a multi-purpose international convention center in Niigata, Niigata Prefecture, Japan. The center was opened on May 1, 2003, and contains a hotel, restaurants, an art museum, conference rooms, and the offices of several international organizations.

Since 2004, Toki Messe has been the site of home games for the Niigata Albirex Basketball Team.

Toki Messe is the tallest building on the Sea of Japan, and has an observation deck on the 31st floor where one can view the areas in and around Niigata. Depending on the weather, one can also see Sado and Awashima islands.

The complex is named after the toki, the official bird of Niigata Prefecture.

Access
It takes about 20 minutes on foot from Niigata Station Bandai Exit.

Transit bus
There is a Niigata Kotsu "Sado-Kisen Line" bus stop 'Toki Messe'. Also, Niigata City Loop Bus has a stop 'Toki Messe'. It takes about 15 minutes from Niigata Station Bandai Exit.

See also
 Bandai Bridge
 Niigata Nippo Media Ship
 Next21

References

External links
 

Convention centers in Japan
Basketball venues in Japan
Buildings and structures in Niigata (city)
Sports venues in Niigata Prefecture
Tourist attractions in Niigata Prefecture
Sports venues completed in 2003
2003 establishments in Japan
Skyscraper office buildings in Japan
Skyscraper hotels in Japan